St. Luke Elementary School is a Catholic primary school in Waterloo, Ontario. The school instructs students from Junior Kindergarten (JK) to the eighth grade. St. Luke opened in 2001 and is a part of the Waterloo Catholic District School Board. It is one of the feeder schools for St. David Catholic Secondary School.

The school motto is "Rooted in the Love of Christ" and the school is named after Luke the Evangelist.  The local Parish for the school St. Agnes Parish which supports the school's Sacramental programs.

While not directly affiliated with the school, Owl Child Care provides childcare services in a separate section of the building. 

The school's sports teams are known as the Lightning.

External links
 St. Luke website
 An alphabetical list of Waterloo Catholic District School Board schools
 Ontario's Ministry of Education

Waterloo Catholic District School Board
Elementary schools in the Regional Municipality of Waterloo
Schools in Waterloo, Ontario
Catholic elementary schools in Ontario
Educational institutions established in 2001
2001 establishments in Ontario